In molecular biology, the X8 domain, is thought to play a role in targeting the plasmodesmata by providing it with structural support. The domain is able to do this since it contains signal sequences for a glycosylphosphatidylinositol (GPI) linkage to the extracellular face of the plasma membrane. This domain is involved in carbohydrate binding.

Structure
The X8 domain contains 6 conserved cysteine residues that presumably form three disulphide bridges. The domain is  also found in an Olive pollen allergen as well as at the C terminus of family 17 glycosyl hydrolases.

References

Protein domains